Oberea posticata is a species of beetle in the family Cerambycidae. It was described by Charles Joseph Gahan in 1895.

References

Beetles described in 1895
posticata